Troy Baker (born April 1, 1976) is an American voice actor and musician. Baker is known for his video game roles, including Joel Miller in The Last of Us franchise, Booker DeWitt in BioShock Infinite (2013), Samuel "Sam" Drake in Uncharted 4: A Thief's End (2016) and Uncharted: The Lost Legacy (2017), Rhys in Tales from the Borderlands (2014), Snow Villiers in Final Fantasy XIII (2010), Kanji Tatsumi in Persona 4 (2008), Higgs Monaghan in Death Stranding (2019), and Talion in Middle-earth: Shadow of Mordor (2014) and Middle-earth: Shadow of War (2017). He also voiced Magni in God of War (2018). He currently holds the record for the most acting nominations at the BAFTA Games Awards, with 5 between 2013 and 2021.

Baker has also voiced Batman, Joker, Hawkeye, and Loki in various media, and has provided voices for a number of English dubs of anime, including Bleach, Fullmetal Alchemist: Brotherhood, Naruto: Shippuden, Code Geass, and Soul Eater. He was previously the lead singer and rhythm guitarist for the alternative rock band Tripp Fontaine, with whom he released an album titled Random Thoughts on a Paper Napkin (2004). He then released the solo album Sitting in the Fire (2014) before he and his backing band changed their name to Window to the Abbey and released the album Moving Around Bias (2017).

Career

Acting

Baker began his voice acting career doing radio commercials in Dallas. He was recruited by Christopher Sabat to do voice-over work at Funimation for the English adaptation of the anime Case Closed. He went on to work in dubbing anime such as Bleach, Dragon Ball Z, Fullmetal Alchemist, Fullmetal Alchemist: Brotherhood, Naruto, Naruto: Shippuden, and the Funimation dub of One Piece. He then moved to Los Angeles and began working on Marvel-based animated series, providing the voice of various characters in The Avengers: Earth's Mightiest Heroes, as well as Hawkeye and Loki in Ultimate Spider-Man and Avengers Assemble.

Baker's career in the video game industry began when he voiced Matt Baker in the tactical shooter series Brothers in Arms. In an interview with The Griff, he said, "It was starting to become necessary for actors to become involved [in gaming], so I got into that and it was literally stumbling from one job into the next. That was kind of my first snowball effect." His most notable roles came in 2013, when he provided the voice of Booker DeWitt in BioShock Infinite and the voice and motion capture of Joel in The Last of Us. Both games earned critical acclaim, gaining scores over 90% on GameRankings and Metacritic, and widespread commercial success. He was nominated for both of these roles at VGX 2013, winning for The Last of Us. He then worked on Uncharted 4: A Thief's End, playing Nathan Drake's older brother Sam. He reprised the role in Uncharted: The Lost Legacy.

In 2011, Baker became the voice of Siris, the hero of Chair Entertainment's blockbuster mobile game series Infinity Blade, and in 2014 he was the voice of Talion, the protagonist of Middle-earth: Shadow of Mordor, which earned a rating of 9.3 on IGN. He also voiced Ace (Experiment 262) in the English dub of the anime Stitch! He was listed on Entertainment Weekly in their best of 2013 issue for best breakout actor in the video game industry for his performances in The Last of Us, BioShock Infinite, and as the Joker in Batman: Arkham Origins. He is one of the few actors to have portrayed Batman (Lego Batman 2: DC Super Heroes, Lego Batman 3: Beyond Gotham, Lego Dimensions, Batman: The Telltale Series and Batman: The Enemy Within), the Joker (Batman: Arkham Origins), and the three major iterations of Robin (Tim Drake in Batman: Arkham City, Dick Grayson (as Nightwing) in Injustice: Gods Among Us and Jason Todd (as Red Hood and the main antagonist) in Batman: Arkham Knight).

In May 2018, Baker and voice actor Nolan North began hosting the weekly YouTube series Retro Replay. In April 2020, due to an apparent disagreement on the future direction of the show, Baker left to start his own series.

Music
Before pursuing acting, Baker was the lead singer and rhythm guitarist for the alternative rock band Tripp Fontaine, which released the radio single "Burning Out" from their debut album Random Thoughts on a Paper Napkin in 2004.

Baker's first solo album, Sitting in the Fire, was released on October 14, 2014. On October 6, 2017, Baker and his backing band, also called Sitting in the Fire, released his second album Moving Around Bias under the new name of Window to the Abbey.

Personal life
In 2012, Baker married photographer Pamela Walworth, also from Dallas. They reside in Los Angeles. They have a son who was born in 2018.

Filmography

Anime

Animation
{| class="wikitable sortable plainrowheaders"
|-
! Year 
! Title
! Role 
! class="unsortable"| Notes 
! class="unsortable"| 
|-
|  || Mr. Meaty || Mr. Wink ||   ||  
|-
| rowspan="2" |  || Gormiti: The Lords of Nature Return! || Magor, Old Sage || ||
|-
| Monster High || Mr. Lou Zarr || Episode: "New Ghoul @ School" || 
|-
| –12 || Scooby-Doo! Mystery Incorporated || Blue Falcon, Red Humonganaut, Krod, others ||  || 
|-
| –12 || The Avengers: Earth's Mightiest Heroes || Whirlwind, Grey Gargoyle, Constrictor, Groot, Eric O'Grady, others ||  || 
|-
| –13 || Generator Rex || Van Kleiss, Biowulf, Roswell, Etude, Weaver, Additional Voices ||   || 
|-
|  || G.I. Joe: Renegades || Dr. Kurt Schnurr / Airtight || Episode: "The Anaconda Strain" || 
|-
| –17 || Regular Show || Dr. Rueben Langer, Klorgbane the Destroyer, Park Avenue, David, others  ||  || 
|-
| –14 || NFL Rush Zone: Season of the Guardians || Wild Card, Warren, Coach Wildwood, Charles Reynolds ||   || 
|-
| –17 || Ultimate Spider-Man || Loki, Hawkeye, Montana, Shocker, others ||   ||  
|-
|  || Lego Marvel Super Heroes: Maximum Overload || Loki || Television special || 
|-
| –19 || Avengers Assemble || Hawkeye, Loki, Whiplash, Kraven the Hunter, Red Guardian ||   || 
|-
|  || Clarence || Troy, Keith Mack, Laser Game Voice || Episode: "Money Broom Wizard" || 
|-
| –15 || Hulk and the Agents of S.M.A.S.H. || Loki, Young Loki, Asgardian Guard ||   || 
|-
| rowspan="2" | || Batman Unlimited|| The Joker|| Web series || 
|-
| Lego Marvel Super Heroes: Avengers Reassembled || Hawkeye || Television special || 
|-
| –17 || Transformers: Robots in Disguise || Steeljaw, Vector Prime, Vladd Gastlee, Arnold ||   || 
|-
| rowspan="2" | || Guardians of the Galaxy|| Loki, Hermod, Hawkeye ||  || 
|-
| Be Cool, Scooby-Doo!|| Jack, Josh, Jester || || 
|-
| rowspan="2" | || Justice League Action|| Hawkman, Jonas, Kanto||  || 
|-
| Ben 10|| Lord Decibel ||  || 
|-
| rowspan="2" | –18 || Spider-Man|| Kraven the Hunter, Hot Dog Guy || ||
|-
| Stretch Armstrong & The Flex Fighters|| Mortar || ||
|-
| || Carmen Sandiego|| Dash Haber || ||
|-
|  –22 ||  Amphibia|| Grime, Waiter, Additional Voices || ||
|-
|  ||  American Dad!|| The Narrator, Ernie || ||
|-
| –present || Young Justice || Geo-Force, Guy Gardner, Dr. Simon Ecks, Blue Devil, others || Season 3-4 || 
|-
|  || Lego City Adventures || Snake Rattler || Season 2 ||
|-
| rowspan="3" |  || Dota: Dragon's Blood || Invoker, Dark Moon Order Guard, Crazed Soldier || Netflix series || 
|-
| Family Guy
| Jorah Mormont
| 2 episodes
|
|-
| Rick and Morty
| Timmy Timtim
| 2 episodes
|
|-
| 2019–2022
| Love, Death & Robots
| Torrin
| Episode: "Bad Travelling"
|-
| 2023
| The Legend of Vox Machina| Syldor Vessar
| 

|}

Film

Video games

Other

Live-action

Discography
Studio albums
 Random Thoughts on a Paper Napkin (2004, with Tripp Fontaine)
 Sitting in the Fire (2014, solo)
 Moving Around Bias (2017, with Window to the Abbey)

Singles
 "Burning Out" (2004, with Tripp Fontaine)
 "My Religion" (2013, solo)
 "Merry Christmas" (2015, solo)
 "Water into Wine" (2017, with Window to the Abbey)
 "The Promise" (2017, with Window to the Abbey)

Video game performances
 "Take Me to Hell (Broken Dream)" in Shadows of the Damned (2011)
 "Will the Circle Be Unbroken?" (with Courtnee Draper) in BioShock Infinite (2013)
 "Cold, Cold Heart" in the Batman: Arkham Origins DLC of the same name (2013)
 "Happy Birthday: Congratulations" in Metal Gear Solid V: The Phantom Pain (2015)
 "Wayfaring Stranger" (with Ashley Johnson) and "Future Days" in The Last of Us Part II'' (2020)

Awards and nominations

Notes

References

External links

 
 
 
 
 

1976 births
Living people
American alternative rock musicians
American male film actors
American male television actors 
American male video game actors
American male voice actors
Animal impersonators
Audiobook narrators
Male actors from Dallas
Pixar people
Spike Video Game Award winners
YouTubers from Texas
20th-century American male actors
21st-century American male actors
21st-century American male singers
21st-century American singers